North Gregory is a rural locality in the Bundaberg Region, Queensland, Australia.

Geography
The Gregory River forms the southern boundary.

Road infrastructure
Childers Road (State Route 3) runs along the south-western boundary.

References 

Bundaberg Region
Localities in Queensland